The Men's omnium was held on 20 October 2017. 25 riders were entered, of which 20 qualified and went on to compete across four events.

Results

Qualifying
The top 10 riders in each heat qualified for the final.
Heat 1

Heat 2

Scratch race
Standings after 1 event.

Tempo race
Standings after 2 events.

Elimination race
Standings after 3 events.

Points race and final standings
Riders' points from the previous 3 events were carried into the points race, in which the final standings were decided.

References

Men's omnium
European Track Championships – Men's omnium